Aleksandr Giviyevich Kakhidze (born 24 April 1999) is a Russian-Georgian football player. He plays for FC Yenisey Krasnoyarsk.

Club career
He made his debut in the Russian Football National League for FC Veles Moscow on 1 August 2020 in a game against FC Tekstilshchik Ivanovo, as a starter.

International career
He was born and raised in Russia, but was called up to Georgia national under-19 football team for the 2017 UEFA European Under-19 Championship. He remained on the bench at the tournament.

References

External links
 
 Profile by Russian Football National League
 

1999 births
People from Balashikha
Sportspeople from Moscow Oblast
Living people
Russian sportspeople of Georgian descent
Russian footballers
Footballers from Georgia (country)
Georgia (country) youth international footballers
Association football defenders
CF Montañesa players
FC Metallurg Lipetsk players
FC Veles Moscow players
FC Yenisey Krasnoyarsk players
Russian Second League players
Russian First League players
Russian expatriate footballers
Expatriate footballers from Georgia (country)
Expatriate footballers in Spain
Russian expatriate sportspeople in Spain
Expatriate sportspeople from Georgia (country) in Spain